Don Guillermo Castro (born 1810) was a Californio ranchero, military officer, and surveyor who once owned vast land holdings in Alameda County. He is the namesake of the city of Castro Valley and his estate, Rancho San Lorenzo, is the namesake of the city of San Lorenzo.

Biography
Castro was born in Rancho San Francisco de las Llagas, near Coyote, California, in Santa Clara County, to Carlos Antonio Castro.  Castro was a career soldier and lieutenant of the militia in the Mexican army, posted to the Pueblo of San José. He also worked as a surveyor for the government (listed as such in 1838). Three years later, in 1841, Governor Juan Alvarado granted Castro  as a reward for service. The grant, called Rancho San Lorenzo, included much of what is today Castro Valley, Hayward, and San Lorenzo.

Soon after receiving his land grant, Castro married Luisa Peralta of the Rancho San Antonio (owned by Luís María Peralta, possibly Luisa's father). The young couple received 300 cattle as a wedding gift. As a rancher, Castro added 4000 sheep and 500 horses, and in the next 7 years, 7 children. The adobe home of the couple was discovered years later beneath the foundation of the old Hayward city hall.

Over the next 26 years, Castro set himself on the path to self-destruction, due to his compulsive gambling. He began selling off portions of his rancho to cover his gambling debts, finally mortgaging his property. To add to his financial problems he had to pay for lawsuits to force squatters off his land, brought by the influx of settlers from the California Gold Rush.  One squatter he tried to evict, and later hired, was William Dutton Hayward for whom the city of Hayward was later named. In 1864, sheriff I. A. Mayhew presided over the sale of the last of the rancho for 400,000 dollars to Faxon Atherton. Destitute, Castro left California for Chile with his wife and younger children.

A contemporary, Jacob Harlan said of Castro, "Of the Spanish Californians that I have known, Guillermo Castro was the best. He was a sparse, wiry man with brown eyes and hair and was physically active and tough. He was a splendid horseman and he was very extravagant and spent his money freely."

Castro family
Guillermo Castro was a grandson of Joaquin Ysidro de Castro, who came to the San Jose area as a member of the 1775 colonization expedition led from Mexico by Juan Bautista de Anza. The Castro family became one of the most numerous and important Californio families of Alta California, and Guillermo was one of many Castro rancho grantees.

References

 http://mycastrovalley.com/history/page02.html MyCastroValley Website: Castro Valley - Don Castro - 1838
 https://web.archive.org/web/20060629065825/http://haywardareahistory.org/CastroValleyEras.html Hayward Historical Society Website

1810 births
Year of death missing
Californios
People of Alta California
Military personnel from California
People from Castro Valley, California